Stenothyridae is a family of small freshwater snails, snails with gills and an operculum, aquatic gastropod mollusks in the superfamily Truncatelloidea.

This family has no subfamilies.

Distribution 
There are known about 60 freshwater species of Stenothyridae in the Palearctic (6 species), Oriental (about 60 species) and Australasian region (about 5 species) and some marine. There are 19 endemic species of Stenothyridae in the Lower Mekong River flowing through Thailand, Laos and Cambodia.

Description
American malacologist George Washington Tryon firstly defined this taxon as Stenothyrinæ in 1866. Tryon's diagnosis reads as follows:

Currently the genus Gabbia is classified within the family Bithyniidae.

Genera 
Genera within the family Stenothyridae include:
 Farsithyra Glöer & Pešić, 2009
 Gangetia Ancey, 1890
 Stenothyra Benson, 1856 - type genus of the family Stenothyridae

Ecology 
The habitat of Stenothyridae include rivers, streams and estuaries. Stenothyridae invaded freshwater habitats from marine ones in at least one independent lineage. Some species of Stenothyridae are euryhaline and/or marine. Probably there are some amphidromous (migrate from freshwater to the sea) species of Stenothyridae.

References 
This article incorporates public domain text from the reference

External links